Paul Wallace Carr (January 31, 1934 – February 17, 2006) was an American actor, director, writer, and producer who performed on stage, film, and television for half a century.

Early life
Carr was born and raised in Marrero, Louisiana, the son of Elaine Grace (Coulon), who was of Cajun (French) descent, and New Yorker Edward Sidney Carr, who worked in publishing. As a teenager, he had an interest in both music and acting. Following some acting locally, he moved to New York and studied acting at the American Theatre Wing.

Career
After a short stint in the United States Marine Corps during his late teens, Carr launched his acting career with a role in a New Orleans production of Herman Melville's Billy Budd. By the middle 1950s, he was working on live television in New York City, including appearances on the popular Studio One and Kraft Television Theater, while continuing theatrical work in stock companies in Ohio and Michigan, including roles such as Peter Quilpe in The Cocktail Party, Haemon in Antigone, Jack in Tennessee Williams' The Rose Tattoo, and Hal Carter in William Inge's Picnic. He toured in summer stock with Chico Marx in Fifth Season.

Carr made his film debut in 1955 with a small uncredited role in Alfred Hitchcock's thriller The Wrong Man. That same year, he portrayed a prisoner of war in the New York Theatre Guild production of Time Limit on Broadway. His film career continued with a much larger role in Alfred Werker's The Young Don't Cry in 1957 starring James Whitmore and Sal Mineo; and that same year he appeared in the Warner Bros. rock and roll jukebox movie Jamboree as Pete Porter.

He worked steadily on television in the late 1950s and early 1960s with guest spots and supporting roles in many western series such as three appearances on Laramie, Trackdown, four appearances on Rawhide, The Rifleman, Gunsmoke, The Tall Man, The Travels of Jaimie McPheeters, and The Virginian. He also appeared in many dramas. One such appearance was in 1964 when he played folk singer and defendant Con Bolton in the Perry Mason episode "The Case of the Tandem Target". He also appeared on 77 Sunset Strip, Straightaway, The Everglades, Dr. Kildare, Going My Way, Hawaii Five-O, The Fugitive, Twelve O'Clock High, and The Silent Force, interspersed with occasional film work, including Captain Newman, M.D.. Other television appearances were on Burke's Law, Combat!, The Time Tunnel, Land of the Giants, Star Trek, and The Invaders.

In 1965, Carr acted in the role of Bill Horton, the physician son of protagonist Dr. Tom Horton on Days of Our Lives in its first season. He was later a regular on General Hospital and The Doctors. Carr went on to work in many of other television shows in the intervening years, including Get Smart, Mannix, The Rockford Files, Police Story and Murphy Brown. He may be remembered best, however, for his various appearances on science fiction shows over the years. In 1964/1965, he had the recurring role of uptight crewman Casey Clark on Voyage to the Bottom of the Sea.

In 1965, Carr played Lt. Lee Kelso, the USS Enterprise helmsman in the second Star Trek pilot episode, "Where No Man Has Gone Before". The episode finally aired, out of sequence in terms of new episodes produced, early in the first season of Star Trek in the autumn of 1966. Carr would later use the name Lee Kelso as a pseudonym for his voice performances in the English-language versions of the anime shows Cowboy Bebop and Trigun.

In 1981, he joined the cast of Buck Rogers in the 25th Century as 'Lt. Devlin', one of the officers on the Earth Starship Searcher.

Throughout his career, Carr's first love was the stage. He appeared in nearly 100 stage productions on Broadway, off-Broadway and off-off-Broadway, as well as touring companies, stock, and in regional theaters around the United States. He received the LA Weekly Theater Award for Best Actor in the Theatre East production of Manhattan Express in 1987 and garnered a 1995 Dramalogue Award for his role in the Los Angeles Repertory production of Assassins.  Carr was also a writer and director, and headed the Play Committee of the L.A. Repertory Company.

Death
Carr died of lung cancer in Los Angeles on February 17, 2006. He was 72.

Selected filmography 

 The Wrong Man (1956) as Young Man (uncredited)
 The Young Don't Cry (1957) as Tom Bradley
 Jamboree (1957) as Pete Porter
 One Step Beyond (1959), episode "Reunion" as Peter
 Bonanza (1960), episode "Death at Dawn" as McNeil
 Gunsmoke (1961-1965) as Cully Tate & Jud Gibbijohn
 Posse from Hell (1961) as Jock Wiley
 General Hospital (1963) as Dr. Peter Taylor No. 1 (1969) / Milton Stanus (1994)
 Captain Newman, M.D. (1963) as Arthur Werbel
 Days of Our Lives as Bill Horton (1965–66)
 Combat! (1966) as Kleinschmidt in two-part episode "Hills Are for Heroes"
 Star Trek, episode #1.03 (1966) "Where No Man Has Gone Before" - Lt. Lee Kelso
 In Cold Blood (1967) as Flo's Lover (uncredited)
 The Green Hornet (1967) as Eddie Carter
 The Invaders (1967) as Billy Stearns
 The Silent Force (1970, in episode "The Judge") as Dr. Morris
 Columbo: Ransom for a Dead Man (1971) as Hammond
 Brute Corps (1971) as Ross
 Trampa mortal (1972)
 Ben (1972) as Kelly
 A Man for Hanging (1972) as Shep Barrenger
 The Dirt Gang (1972) as Monk and associate producer
 The Severed Arm (1973) as Sgt. Mark Richards
 Executive Action (1973) as Gunman (Chris) - Team A
 The Bat People (1974) as Dr. Kipling
 Truck Stop Women (1974) as Seago
 Adventures of the Queen (1975) as Walter Fletcher
 The Six Million Dollar Man as Timberlake / Reverend Essex / Police Officer Paul Cord 
 The Rockford Files (1975) episode "The Four Pound Brick" as Police Sgt. Andy Wilson
 The Bionic Woman (1975) as Timberlake
 The Deadly Tower (1975) as Officer C.T. Foss
 The Lives of Jenny Dolan (1975) as Eddie Owens
 Sisters of Death (1976) as Mark
 The Doctors (1976) as Dr. Paul Summers
 The Rockford Files (1978) episode "Empty Frame" as Jeff Levane
 Greatest Heroes of the Bible (1979) as Belzar
 Scruples (1980) as Pat O'Byrnne
 Raise the Titanic! (1980) as CIA Director Nicholson
 The Incredible Hulk (1980) as Alan Grable
 Buck Rogers in the 25th Century (1981) as Lt. Devlin
 Airwolf (1984 Season 1 : Ep. 6) as Simon Sayes
 Akira (1988) as man on Nezu's Phone (2001 Pioneer dub) (English version)
 Under the Boardwalk (1989) as Track
 Generations (1989) as Alex Hawkins
 Eat a Bowl of Tea (1989) as Fry Cook
 Night Eyes (1990) as Tom Michaelson
 Solar Crisis (1990) as IXL executive #2
 Dangerous Women as Ben Cronin
 Father & Son: Dangerous Relations (1993)
 Scorned (1994) as Kramer
 Cowboy Bebop as Van; Pao Puzi (credited as Lee Kelso)
 Blood: The Last Vampire (2000) as School Headmaster (voice)
 Spotlight on Paul Carr (2002) as himself
 Ghost in the Shell: Stand Alone Complex as Matsuoka (English version, voice)

References

External links
 The Official Paul Carr Website
 
 
 

 Crewman Clarks page at vttbots.com

1934 births
2006 deaths
20th-century American male actors
American male stage actors
American male film actors
Film producers from California
American male television actors
Deaths from lung cancer in California
Male actors from New Orleans
People from Marrero, Louisiana
Male actors from New York City
Male actors from Los Angeles
United States Marines
Western (genre) television actors
Film producers from New York (state)
Film producers from Louisiana